Aseem Batra is an American television director, producer and actress.

Biography
Born in Ohio to Indian parents, she moved to rural Georgia at the age of three and Orange County, California at twelve. She was a communications and theater double major at the University of California, San Diego before going to graduate school for communications management at the University of Southern California.

Batra was a producer and writer on Scrubs, where she also played the character Josephine. In 2009, she began writing and producing on The Cleveland Show. Mike Henry, commenting on being a white man voicing the African American Cleveland Brown, noted how the character's stereotypical redneck neighbors were voiced by black actor Kevin Michael Richardson and Batra. As a producer, Batra was part of the nomination of the episode "Murray Christmas" for Primetime Emmy Award for Outstanding Animated Program at the 63rd Primetime Emmy Awards.

In February 2015, it was announced that Batra would write a "politically incorrect" sitcom pilot for NBC alongside the Russo brothers, with whom she had previously worked on Animal Practice and an unfinished semi-autobiographical comedy. Three years later, the same network picked up an untitled project written by Batra and executive produced alongside Amy Poehler; it aired from September as I Feel Bad.

References

External links

Living people
American people of Indian descent
University of Southern California alumni
American television writers
American television producers
American television actresses
American voice actresses
Year of birth missing (living people)